Olshanka is a rural locality (a selo) in Chernyansky District of Belgorod Oblast, Russia.

References

Rural localities in Chernyansky District
Novooskolsky Uyezd